Year 214 (CCXIV) was a common year starting on Saturday (link will display the full calendar) of the Julian calendar. At the time, it was known as the Year of the Consulship of Messalla and Suetrius (or, less frequently, year 967 Ab urbe condita). The denomination 214 for this year has been used since the early medieval period, when the Anno Domini calendar era became the prevalent method in Europe for naming years.

Events 
 By place 

 Roman Empire 
 The kingdom of Osroene becomes a province of the Roman Empire.
 Caracalla's victories in Germany ensure his popularity within the Roman army.
 The defences of Rhaetia are reinforced, in the form of an uninterrupted stone wall.

 Korea 
 The Korean kingdom of Baekje attacks the Mohe tribes.
 Gusu becomes king of Baekje.

 China 
 Battle of Xiaoyao Ford: General Zhang Liao under the command of Cao Cao beats back Sun Quan at Hefei.
 Liu Bei takes Yi Province from his clansman Liu Zhang, forming the later basis for Shu Han during the Three Kingdoms period.
 Pang Tong dies in the hands of the enemy in an ambush at the Valley of the Fallen Phoenix.

Births 
 May 10 – Claudius Gothicus, Roman emperor (d. 270)
 September 9 – Aurelian, Roman emperor (d. 275)
 Cao Gan, Chinese prince and son of Cao Cao (d. 261)
 Diophantus, Greek mathematician (approximate date)
 Musa al-Mubarraqa, Arab imam (Twelver Shia) (d. 296)
 Yang Huiyu, Chinese empress dowager (d. 278)

Deaths 
 Chogo of Baekje, Korean ruler
 Fu Shou, Chinese empress of the Han Dynasty
 Kuai Yue (or Yidu), Chinese politician and adviser
 Pang Tong, Chinese politician and adviser (b. 179)
 Peng Yang (or Yongnian), Chinese official (b. 178)
 Sun Qian, Chinese diplomat, general and politician 
 Xun You, Chinese statesman and adviser (b. 157)

References